was the eighth of nine post stations along the Minoji. It is located in the present-day city of Ōgaki, Gifu Prefecture, Japan. In addition to serving as a post station, it was also a castle town to the Ōgaki Domain's Ōgaki Castle. Its dual role is very similar to that of the nearby Kanō-juku along the Nakasendō.

Town layout
The location of the former post station can be traced along the Tenma-chō, Hon-machi, Takejima-chō, Tawara-machi, Funa-machi, and Kusegawa-chō areas of the city.

Neighboring post towns
Minoji
Sunomata-juku - Ōgaki-juku - Tarui-juku

References

Post stations in Gifu Prefecture